The Poeae are the largest tribe of the grasses, with around 2,500 species in 121 genera. The tribe includes many lawn and pasture grasses.

Taxonomy
Two separate tribes, Poeae and Aveneae, used to be distinguished based on morphology, but phylogenetic analysis showed that they are intermingled. Poeae now includes the former Aveneae. Phylogenetic analyses identified two lineages based on chloroplast genomes. The genera are classified in 25 subtribes.

Reticulate evolution occurred repeatedly in the tribe.

Chloroplast group 1

Chloroplast group 2

References

External links 

 
Poaceae tribes
Taxa named by Robert Brown (botanist, born 1773)